Route 239 is a highway in the Trinity Bight portion of Newfoundland in the Canadian province of Newfoundland and Labrador.  It is a short route, running from a junction at Route 230, starting at the community of Lockston and ending at the community of New Bonaventure.

Route 239 is one of only two highway numbers in Newfoundland and Labrador that end in the number 9 (the other being Route 419 on the Baie Verte Peninsula).

Route description

Route 239 begins in Lockston at an intersection with Route 230 (Bonavista Peninsula Highway/Discovery Trail) and it immediately passes south through the community. The highway leaves Lockston and winds its way south along the coastline to have an intersection with a local road leading to Trinity before passing through Goose Cove and Dunfield. Route 239 winds its way more inland through hilly terrain for several kilometres, where it passes through Trouty, before coming to a fork in the road, with a local road leading to Old Bonaventure (Route 239-15), and Route 239 continues south to New Bonaventure, where the highway comes to a dead end at the town's harbour.

Major intersections

References

239